Katharin "Kathy" Kelker (born May 7, 1943) is an American politician serving as a Democratic member of the Montana House of Representatives.

2014 election
In the 2014 election, Mary McNally ran unopposed in the primary until she withdrew to become the replacement nominee for Montana Senate district 24. Kelker took her place and defeated Republican opponent Joshua Sizemore.

2016 election
Kelker ran unopposed in the primary and defeated Republican Jason Thomas.

2018 election
Kelker ran unopposed in the primary and defeated Republican Colton Zaugg.

2020 election
Kelker ran unopposed in the primary and defeated Republican TJ Smith.

References 

1943 births
21st-century American politicians
21st-century American women politicians
Living people
Democratic Party members of the Montana House of Representatives
Politicians from Billings, Montana
People from Cleveland
Women state legislators in Montana